Frank Percy Wilson  (11 October 1889 – 29 May 1963) was a British literary scholar and bibliographer. Author of many works on Elizabethan drama and general editor of the Oxford History of English Literature, Wilson was Merton Professor of English Literature at the University of Oxford from 1947 to 1957.

Education and early career
Wilson was born and raised in Birmingham, studying at King Edward's School, Birmingham.  He received his BA (1911) and MA (1912) in English at the University of Birmingham, and a B. Litt. at Lincoln College, Oxford, in 1913, writing his thesis on Thomas Dekker.

At the outbreak of World War I Wilson joined the army, serving in France, and sustaining serious injuries at Battle of the Somme in 1916.  Recovery in hospital took over a year, and, besides, left Wilson with a permanent limp and vulnerability to recurrent infections.  He returned to Oxford as University Lecturer in 1921 and was promoted to Reader in 1927.  He became the Tutor of C. S. Lewis in 1922.  At Oxford, Wilson published Dekker's Foure Birds of Noahs Arke (1924) and Plague Pamphlets of T. Dekker (1925).  He worked on and off for many years on a four volume edition of Dekker's prose works, but it was never completed.  However, the incidental, The Plague in Shakespeare's London (1925) proved popular with readers and was brought out in paperback in 1958.

Later career
During the next three decades, Wilson was to serve as Professor of English Literature at the University of Leeds (1929–1936), Hildred Carlile professor of English literature at Bedford College, London (1936–1947), and Merton Professor of English Literature at Oxford (1947–57), remaining at Oxford for three years more as Senior Research Fellow at Merton College.

He visited many American academic institutions during this time, including Huntington Library in San Marino, California, on three separate occasions, Columbia University, Folger Shakespeare Library and Stanford University.  In addition, he gave lectures, all later published, at University of Toronto, Smith College, Johns Hopkins University, and UCLA.

With Bonamy Dobrée, Wilson became in 1935 the general editor of the Oxford History of English Literature.  He wrote the volume, English drama from 1485 to 1642 himself.  He gave British Academy lectures in 1941 and the Clark Lectures at Trinity College, Cambridge, in 1951, both published later in book form.

During World War II, in spite of his disability, Wilson served in the Home Guard.  He became general editor of the Malone Society in 1948 and during his dozen years at the helm edited reprints of many works were produced including those of John Fletcher, Samuel Rowley, and Thomas Middleton.

Critical reputation, influence, and honours
According to ODNB biographers, Jean Robertson and P. J. Connell, "The chief merits of Wilson's dramatic criticism were his constant alertness to the exigencies of the stage (he was a promising amateur actor in his early days); and, most remarkably, his unrivalled knowledge of contemporary word usage and phraseology,..." yielding ultimately his Oxford Dictionary of English Proverbs.  He was, they continue, "the most learned Elizabethan scholar of his generation, as well as a master of social graces and a witty conversationalist."

Wilson was elected Fellow of the British Academy in 1943 and awarded an honorary LLD of the University of Birmingham in 1947; he was made an honorary fellow of Lincoln College, Oxford, in 1948.  F. P. Wilson died at his home in Berkshire, on 29 May 1963.

Bibliography

Notes

References

External links 
Frank Percy Wilson Papers. James Marshall and Marie-Louise Osborn Collection. Beinecke Rare Book and Manuscript Library.

1889 births
1963 deaths
People from Birmingham, West Midlands
British literary historians
Alumni of the University of Birmingham
Alumni of Lincoln College, Oxford
Academics of the University of Leeds
Fellows of the British Academy
Merton Professors of English Literature
People educated at King Edward's School, Birmingham
Academics of Bedford College, London
Fellows of Merton College, Oxford